The RPK-2 Vyuga (blizzard; NATO reporting name: SS-N-15 Starfish), also designated as 81R, is a Soviet submarine-launched, nuclear-armed anti-submarine missile system, launched exclusively through  torpedo tubes. The system was designed in Sverdlovsk, Russian SFSR in the 1960s.

Analogous to the SUBROC missile previously used by the US Navy, it is designed to be fired from a 533 mm torpedo tube. The payload ranges from a simple depth charge to a 200 kt thermonuclear warhead.

Design
The RPK-2 uses a 82R torpedo or 90R nuclear depth charge in the 533 mm version, and a 83R torpedo carrying or 86R nuclear depth charge in 650 mm version.

Both submarine- and surface-launched versions exist. However, the munition package used in either is identical and hence the ship-launched version is launched into the water and submerges before firing its engines.

Operators

See also
 Metel Anti-Ship Complex, predecessor
 RPK-6 Vodopad and RPK-7 Veter, successor
 82R Vikhr (SUW-N-1)
 SMART

External links
 Encyclopedia Astronautica
 SS-N-15 Starfish (RPK-2 Viyoga)

Cold War submarine-launched cruise missiles of the Soviet Union
RPK-002
Anti-submarine missiles
Military equipment introduced in the 1960s